Baure is a Local Government Area in Katsina State, Nigeria, sharing a border with the Republic of Niger.

It has an area of 707 km and a population of 197,425 at the 2006 census.

The postal code of the area is 824.

References

Local Government Areas in Katsina State
Niger–Nigeria border crossings